Seldin is a surname. Notable people with the surname include:

Abigail Seldin (born 1988), American edtech entrepreneur
Cletus Seldin (born 1986), American super lightweight boxer
Donald Seldin (1920–2018), American nephrologist
Millard Seldin (1926–2020), American real estate developer, banker, basketball investor, and horsebreeder
Ronnie Nyogetsu Reishin Seldin (1947–2017), American shakuhachi player
Tim Seldin (born 1946), American educator